Rock Lee & His Ninja Pals is the anime adaptation of the Naruto spin-off manga created by Kenji Taira, Rock Lee no Seishun Full-Power Ninden. It was announced in February 2012 by Shueisha. Produced by Studio Pierrot and directed by Masahiko Murata, the series premiered on TV Tokyo on April 3, 2012. Crunchyroll simulcasted the series premiere online and has each episode available for streaming.

The series chronicles the daily life and training of Konohagakure ninja Rock Lee, who can utilize taijutsu, but has no skill in ninjutsu or genjutsu. Episodes feature comical scenes and mini-skits to emphasize the characters' goals and thought processes. Rock Lee & His Ninja Pals is the first spin-off anime series that does not follow the main plot of the Naruto Shippuden series, although it retains the original voice actors. The show ran for one season from 2012 to 2013, spanning 51 episodes. It is currently known that Disney XD Malaysia has started dubbing the show in English. Viz Media announced at Anime Expo that they will be producing an English dub of the show. It was added to the Neon Alley service beginning in Fall 2014. As of March 2015, all 51 episodes are available for online streaming in the US through Hulu and Neon Alley in English dubbed and subtitled formats. Sonic Nickelodeon India has aired the show in the Hindi Language from Monday – Friday with Monday and Tuesday with new episodes and the rest of the week as re-airings.

The series is being released to Region 2 DVD in Japan with three episodes per disc. The first DVD was released on July 18, 2012, containing episodes 1–3.

Across its 51 episodes, the series used two different opening musical themes, and four ending themes. The opening for the first twenty-six episodes was "Give Lee Give Lee Rock Lee" by Animetal USA and Hironobu Kageyama. The second opening theme, used for episodes 27 through 51, was "Love Song" by OKAMOTO'S. The four ending themes were "Twinkle Twinkle" by South Korean girl group Secret (used for episodes 1–13), "Go! Go! Here We Go! Rock Lee" by Shiritsu Ebisu Chugaku, (episodes 14–26), "Daijoubu Bokura" by RAM WIRE (episodes 27–39), and "Icha Icha Chu Chu Kyappi Kyappi Love Love Suri Suri Doki Doki" by HAPPY BIRTHDAY (episodes 40–51).

Episode list

References

Rock Lee & His Ninja Pals
Rock Lee
Rock Lee and His Ninja Pals